The 1998 Compaq Grand Slam Cup was a tennis tournament played on indoor hard courts at the Olympiahalle in Munich in Germany. The event was organized by the International Tennis Federation (ITF), which invited the best-performing players in the year's Grand Slam events to compete in the Grand Slam Cup.

The tournament was held from 28 September to 4 October 1998. The prize money was significant, and therefore the most popular exhibition tournament among the players but there were no ranking points awarded since the ITF had no influence on ATP and WTA who control the ranking system. However the Grand Slam Cup-tournaments would later be recognized by the ATP as official tournaments and a tournament win would be included in the players statistics.

Finals

Men's singles

 Marcelo Ríos defeated  Andre Agassi 6–4, 2–6, 7–6(7–1), 5–7, 6–3
 It was Ríos' 6th title of the year and the 11th of his career.

Women's singles

 Venus Williams defeated  Patty Schnyder 6–2, 3–6, 6–2
 It was Williams' 6th title of the year and the 6th of her career.

Grand Slam Cup
1998 in German tennis